The National Association of Intercollegiate Athletics men's basketball national championship has been held annually since 1937 (with the exception of 1944 and 2020). The tournament was established by James Naismith to crown a national champion for smaller colleges and universities. Through the 2019–20 season, the NAIA Tournament featured 32 teams, and the entire tournament was contested at one location in one week, rather than multiple locations over a series of weekends. Beginning with the 2021 edition, the tournament expanded to 48 teams, starting with play at 16 regional sites, with only the winners at these sites playing at the final venue. The 2022 tournament expanded again to 64 teams.  From 1992 to 2020, the NAIA sponsored a Division II championship. The Division I tournament is played in Kansas City, Missouri, while in 2020, the Division II tournament was to be held for the last time at the Sanford Pentagon in Sioux Falls, South Dakota; however, the tournaments were called off due to the COVID-19 pandemic. The NAIA returned to a one-division setup in 2021. The NAIA games can be watched online through the official NAIA provider StretchInternet.

History
The Men's Basketball Championship is mostly played at the Municipal Auditorium in Kansas City, Missouri. It has been held in Kansas City every year since the tournament began except from 1994 to 2001, when it was played in Tulsa, Oklahoma, and in 2020, when no tournament was held. Kansas City will continue to host until at least 2024. In 2018, the NAIA announced a new format for the 2021 tournament after the merger of D-I and D-II. Under the new format, the men's and women's tournaments each involve 64 teams (the first post-COVID tournaments in 2021 had 48 teams). The first two rounds are played at 16 separate sites, with only the 16 winners at these sites advancing to Kansas City.

The tournament MVP has been presented with the Chuck Taylor Most Valuable Player award since 1939. In 1948 the NAIA became the first national organization to open their intercollegiate postseason to black student-athletes due primarily to the media attention surrounding Manhattan College. Manhattan, who had an all-white team, learned of the NAIA rule that prohibited blacks from participating in the tournament, and after asking the NAIA to rescind the rule, the NAIA refused and Manhattan withdrew from the tournament. "The battle might have ended there but for a man named Harry Henshel, who was a member of the U.S. Olympic basketball committee. One of the reasons that the NAIA tournament was so prestigious was that the champion was invited to compete at the Olympic trials in New York City in late March. (The other teams invited were the two NCAA finalists, three teams from the Amateur Athletic Union, the winner of the National Invitation Tournament, and a YMCA team.)" After reading in the New York papers that blacks could not participate in the tournament, Henshel suggested to the media that the NAIA national champion be eliminated from Olympic consideration. NAIA officials read Hershel’s statement in the papers and quickly took a telegraphic poll amongst its members the following day that rescinded the racial ban. In 1947, Coach John Wooden of Indiana State refused the invitation to the NAIA National Tournament primarily because Clarence J. Walker, the only black player on his team could not participate. Because of the stance taken by Manhattan College and Harry Hansel, in 1948, Coach Wooden was able to take Walker to the tournament who became the first African-American student-athlete to play in the NAIA tournament. Walker, a vital role player, helped the Sycamores finish as the NAIA's national finalist. In 1957, Tennessee State became the first historically black college to win a national championship, and the first team to win three consecutive tournaments. As of 2017, Kentucky State is the only other school to do so (1970, 1971, 1972). Oklahoma City University holds the record for the most tournament championships with six. OCU also holds the record for most national championship titles in NAIA Women's Basketball.

Results

Notes

See also
NAIA Basketball Tournament Most Valuable Player
NAIA Division II Men's Basketball Championship
NAIA Division I Women's Basketball Championship
NAIA Division II Women's Basketball Championship
NCAA Division I men's basketball tournament
NCAA Division II men's basketball tournament
NCAA Division III men's basketball tournament

References

External links